Two, also named Tor&Tong, is a Thai musical duo. It came to popularity in the 1990s under RS Promotion. They are the first duo under the RS label. The duo consists of "Tor" Sahaphap Weerakamin and "Tong" Suraphan Jamlongkul. Their albums Rak Luan Luan Tae Kwan Na, Deng Dai Tah Mai Dieng and Double Two each sold over a million copies.

History
Tor and Tong both attended Suankularb Wittayalai School, where they met. Tor began his career modelling for magazines whereas Tong worked in backing sound for RS. They had a twin look, emphasized by their long hair. As with the Korean duo band Lift&Oil, they wore short, brightly colored T-shirts.

The pair debuted in 1991 with their album Rak Luan Luan Tae Kwan Na. Together, their work Rak Luan Luan Tae Kwan Na, Deng Dai Tah Mai Dieng and Double Two exceeded one million downloads. With Double Two, the band changed their style from Pop-Dance  to Pop-Rock and changed their look. They had one special album Two Outdoor. They tried a switch to alternative, but were unsuccessful.

Tong retired From RS Label to work with Itti Palangkul. They split the duo. In 2006 they returned and made the album one man story, Tor sang Nueay. Tong sang Samnuek..D, Cheewitmai, Khonkeirak and bed time.

They reunited again in 2016 and released a single "We Are Thailand".

Members
Tor-Sahaphap Weerakamin (TH : ต่อ-สหภาพ วีระฆามินทร์)
Tong-Suraphan Jamlongkul (TH : ต๋อง-สุรพันธ์ จำลองกุล)

Discography

Studio albums
Rak Luan Luan Tae Kwan Na 1991
Deng Dai Tah Mai Dieng 1992
Two Double 1995

Compilation albums
RS Unplugged 1994
Two Outdoor 1996
One Man Story 2005

Single
We Are Thailand 2016 (in the name of fly2play project)

Concert
Karom Pehn Tor Rooplor Pehn Tong 1991 MBK Hall
 Two Tid Mun 1993 MBK Hall

Jam Concert
 RS Unplugged Concert 1994 MBK Hall
 RS. Meeting Concert Nok Krueng Bab Zaa (TH:นอกเครื่องแบบ...ซ่า) (7 Oct 1995) MBK Hall
 RS. Freshy Jam Concert (11 Sep 1995) Thai Army Sports Stadium 
 Live Action Jump Concert 1996 MBK Hall

References

1991 establishments in Thailand
1996 disestablishments in Thailand
Thai pop music groups
Thai pop rock musicians
Thai pop rock musical groups
Thai musical duos
Musical groups from Bangkok